is a song by Japanese musical act Superfly. It was released as a double A-side single along with "Koisuru Hitomi wa Utsukushii" in 2009, a month before Superfly's second studio album Box Emotions.

Background and development 
In 2009, Superfly recorded two songs for the Fuji Television drama Boss, starring Yūki Amami. The theme song, a ballad called "My Best of My Life", was released as a single by Superfly on May 13. The drama's upbeat opening theme song "Alright!!" was released as a digital single a month later. Both songs were successful commercially, with "Alright!!" becoming Superfly's biggest hit since "Ai o Komete Hanataba o" (2008).

Promotion and release 
The song was used as the theme song of the morning news program Mezamashi TV, first airing in April 2009. Superfly performed the song live at Music Station on September 4, during the release of Box Emotions.

The song was released as a part of a four-track single on July 29, 2009. In addition to the two A-sides, the single featured a cover of Kuwata Band's 1986 song "Skipped Beat", a song Superfly had performed at Bokura no Ongaku and during her Rock'N'Roll Show 2008 tour. The song is a live recording taken from the tour final of the Rock'N'Roll Show at the NHK Hall on November 9, 2008. The remaining track is a cover of the title track from Jackson Browne's 1974 album Late for the Sky.

Music video 
A music video was produced for the song, directed by Shūichi Banba. It features Ochi in a top-hat, performing the song with her band-mates on an outdoor stage in country-inspired clothing. As she sings, stage hands and other performers, such as a man with a dog and a man dressed as a pole, greet her as they leave the stage. At the end of the video, Ochi and her band-mates run off the stage to reveal the field the video was shot in, and dance with all of the other performers.

Critical reception 
Dai Tanaka of Rockin' On Japan described the song as being exactly like the title implied, "tender emotion" on top of a "good melody". He praised Ochi's musicianship, feeling that the single was an example of her skill as a vocalist. The song was received well by CDJournal reviewers, who noted the song's dramatic classic pop style and praising the melody's development and the lyrics. One reviewer felt the song was a simple, refreshing medium rock song on their first listen, but later felt the layered acoustic guitar sound was ambitious. The song was praised as having a "weighty tone" and a "beautiful melody" that was "tenderly sung", with the reviewers noting that listening to it felt "good like a spring breeze".

Track listings

Personnel
Personnel details were sourced from the liner notes booklet of Box Emotions.

Gen Ittetsu Strings – strings
Kōji Kusakari – electric guitar, acoustic guitar
Hideki Matsubara – bass
Hiroshi "Matsukichi" Matsubara – drums
Shiho Ochi – lead and background vocals, timpani, tambourine
Takumi Sone – acoustic guitar
Kōichi Tabo – acoustic guitar
Kōichi Tsutaya – piano
Yoshiyuki Yatsuhashi – electric guitar, acoustic guitar

Chart rankings

Sales and certifications

Release history

References 

2009 singles
2009 songs
Japanese-language songs
Superfly (band) songs
Warner Music Japan singles